The American Egg Board (AEB) is a United States checkoff marketing organization, which focuses on marketing and promotion of eggs for human consumption. The AEB is best known for its long-running slogan, "The Incredible, Edible Egg", and the Just Mayo scandal.

Organization 
The American Egg Board (AEB) is a checkoff organization, meaning that it is funded by a levy against its members for each unit they produce; in this case, an amount per case of eggs shipped.  Through the AEB, U.S. egg producers come together, in accordance with statutory authority, to establish, finance and execute coordinated programs on research, education and promotion—all geared to drive demand for eggs and egg products. The Board consists of 18 members and 18 alternates from all regions of the country, nominated by the egg industry, and appointed by the U.S. Secretary of Agriculture. AEB and all program activities are funded by U.S. egg producers, subject to USDA approval. AEB is located in Chicago, Ill.

History
American egg farmers approved the creation of the AEB in a 1975 referendum. It was created by the Egg Research and Promotion Order pursuant to the Egg Research and Consumer Information Act of 1974. A referendum was conducted November 3–28, 1975, by the Agricultural Marketing Service and seventy-three percent of eligible producers approved the program. AEB was established by the order and became the American Egg Board, beginning July 9, 1976.

In 1977, American egg farmers also began work on an advertising campaign to increase demand for eggs – its first television commercial began airing in 1977, touting the nutritional benefits as "The Incredible, Edible Egg" featuring actor James Hampton. In 1993, the AEB launched a new advertising campaign called "I Love Eggs", in which the campaign ran from 1993 to 1997. In 1998, the AEB launched another advertising campaign called "If it ain't eggs, it ain't breakfast, I love eggs".

The AEB also promotes the many facets of egg products and the unique functionalities they contribute to many packaged food products. The term ‘egg products’ refers to processed and convenience forms of eggs for foodservice and food manufacturers. These products can be classified as refrigerated liquid, frozen, dried, and pre-cooked products. Additionally, the AEB also works with foodservice professionals to keep eggs on top of evolving food trends, emerging consumer needs and changing competitive landscapes.

Suppression of free marketplace
 
In 2008, the AEB tried to funnel $3 million to a private lobbying organization, attempting to overturn a California ballot measure which would prohibit the extreme confinement of farm animals. This unlawful coordination with an advocacy group was stopped by an injunction issued by a federal court.

Anti-competitive marketing tactics have also been displayed by the AEB in their involvement to get government retailers and regulators to participate in the halting of sales for Just Mayo brand products. The USDA found emails by the AEB threatening to put a “hit” on CEO Josh Tetrick of Hampton Creek, the company that produces Just Mayo brand products.

Hampton Creek campaign
In September 2015, the AEB was investigated regarding their actions of paid advocacy against Hampton Creek, a company marketing vegan egg substitutes and Just Mayo, a mayonnaise substitute which uses pea protein as an emulsifier in place of eggs.

In September 2015, a Freedom of Information request by Ryan Shapiro had revealed a number of cases where the government-controlled AEB had engaged in a systematic paid advocacy campaign targeting Hampton Creek. The AEB paid food bloggers to post articles containing the group's talking points regarding eggs, targeted personalities and websites that had posted articles covering the company in a positive manner, and purchased keyword advertising on Google Search to display advertisements on searches for Hampton Creek or its founder Josh Tetrick, among other actions. AEB chief executive Joanne Ivy stated at one point that Hampton Creek was a "crisis and major threat to the future." She suggested, in remarks that were later claimed to be jokes, to have a murder-for-hire plot initiated against Tetrick. These actions violate USDA policies, which disallow advertising by its marketing boards that are "deemed disparaging to another commodity." The USDA stated in a report that AEB staff “will be required to complete additional training regarding proper email etiquette and ethics.”

As a result of the Hampton Creek scandal, the chief executive of the board, Joanne Ivy, took early retirement.

Egg Nutrition Center 
American egg farmers also established the Egg Nutrition Center (ENC), which serves as a source of nutrition and health science information, and conducts in scientific health research and education related to eggs. ENC also monitors scientific findings and regulatory developments, and serves as a resource for health practitioners.

Charitable Commitment
America's egg farmers have donated millions of eggs to America's food banks and pantries in addition to their ongoing disaster relief work in response to tragedies like the 2010 Haiti earthquake and the 2011 Joplin, Mo. tornado. Additionally, they provide millions of dollars in free educational materials to American schools to help promote agricultural education and agricultural literacy.

White House Easter Egg Roll
Since 1977, AEB also has supported the annual White House Easter Egg Roll, the largest public event on the south lawn of the White House. America's egg farmers donate approximately 30,000 eggs to be rolled, hunted, decorated, and snacked on each year. The Incredible Egg also has a presence on the South Lawn, through “Farm to Table: An Egg’s Journey,” a hands-on exhibit that shows how eggs get from the hen house to the home. A giant inflatable Incredible Balloon and mascot can also be found on the lawn throughout the day and EggPops are handed out as a snack to hungry attendees. This annual event also includes the presentation of a commemorative egg to the First Lady. The Commemorative Eggs are created by artists from across the nation. The eggs become the property of the first family and typically end up on display in the presidential library.

See also
Howard Helmer
United Egg Producers
Agricultural Marketing Service

References

External links 

 

Marketing boards
Egg organizations
Agricultural marketing organizations
Commodity checkoff programs
Agricultural organizations based in the United States